Témiscamingue is a regional county municipality in the Abitibi-Témiscamingue region of western Quebec, Canada. The county seat is Ville-Marie.

Though Témiscamingue borders Pontiac Regional County Municipality to the south, it is not possible to travel between the two within Quebec without taking a major detour north towards Quebec Route 117.  The shorter route is to cross into Ontario at Notre-Dame-du-Nord or Témiscaming and travel south on Highway 11, then east on Highway 17, before crossing back at L'Isle-aux-Allumettes.

Subdivisions
There are 21 subdivisions within the RCM:

Cities and towns (3)
 Belleterre
 Témiscaming
 Ville-Marie

Municipalities (12)
 Béarn
 Duhamel-Ouest
 Fugèreville
 Kipawa
 Laforce
 Laverlochère-Angliers
 Lorrainville
 Moffet
 Notre-Dame-du-Nord
 Rémigny
 Saint-Bruno-de-Guigues
 Saint-Eugène-de-Guigues

Parishes (1)
 Saint-Édouard-de-Fabre

Townships (2)
 Guérin
 Nédélec

United townships (1)
 Latulipe-et-Gaboury

Unorganized territory (2)
 Laniel
 Les Lacs-du-Témiscamingue

Indian reserve or settlement (4)
 Hunter's Point
 Kebaowek
 Timiskaming
 Winneway

Demographics

Population

Language

Transportation

Access routes
Highways and numbered routes that run through the municipality, including external routes that start or finish at the county border:

 Autoroutes
 None

 Principal Highways
 

 Secondary Highways
 
 

 External Routes

See also
 List of regional county municipalities and equivalent territories in Quebec

References

 Affaires Municipales et Regions Quebec
 Statistics Canada

 
Regional county municipalities in Abitibi-Témiscamingue
Census divisions of Quebec